Crystal HD is the Broadcom's hardware SIP core that performs video decoding.

Product description
Crystal HD has been available as single chip high-definition advanced media processors BCM70012 (codenamed Link) and BCM70015 (codenamed Flea); these chips are found on mini PCIe cards for purchase.

The BCM970012 supports hardware decoding of H.264/MPEG-4 AVC, VC-1, WMV9 and MPEG-2 and the BCM970015 additionally supports DivX 3.11, 4.1, 5.X, 6.X and Xvid. VP8, VP9, Daala and HEVC are not supported.

Broadcom Crystal HD is found in Intel Atom based machines, such as the Dell Inspiron Mini 10 HP Slate 500 or ExoPC, ASUS Eee Keyboard.

The commercial relevancy of dedicated video decoding accelerators has been eclipsed by the launch of the Intel Core i-series, featuring an integrated GPU with hardware video decoding (formerly only widespreadly available in discrete GPUs); nevertheless, a small number of enthusiasts maintaining and upgrading their older computers, especially for HTPC use, kept a number of cards circulating in the used market.

Operating system support 
The Crystal HD SIP core needs to be supported by the device driver, which provides the videos interfaces. One of these interfaces is then used by end-user software, for example Media Player Classic or GStreamer, to access the CrystalHD hardware and make use of it.

Linux 
Broadcom has published a device driver for Linux under the GNU General Public License (GPL) version 2. Broadcom also published application and library source code on a royalty-free basis under the GNU Lesser General Public License (LGPL), version 2.1

Crystal HD can be accessed through the Video Acceleration API interface via an experimental driver (however, it cannot be recovered from the linked archive). There is a GStreamer plugin available.

There is support for Broadcom Crystal HD available in FFmpeg and MPlayer when compiled with the corresponding option.

It can be added to the first generation Apple TV when OSMC is installed, although support was dropped in 2017.

Microsoft Windows 
Broadcom has published a device driver for Microsoft Windows which provides accelerated DirectShow renderers filters.

See also 
 Nvidia PureVideo
 AMD Unified Video Decoder
 Intel Quick Sync Video
 Amlogic Video Engine

Related Broadcom technologies 
 Xilleon
 VideoCore

References 

Broadcom
Video acceleration
Video compression and decompression ASIC